Galaga Remix is an iOS game based on Galaga released in 2009 by Namco Bandai games. It is a compilation title featuring the 1981 arcade shooter Galaga and the Namco Museum Battle Collection version of Galaga Arrangement, though the game is titled Galaga Remix. The games play identical to their original counterparts, with controls being adapted for touch screens, however the compilation lacks the 2-player modes from the original games.

As of March 30, 2015, the app has been delisted from the App Store and is no longer available for download. Galaga Remix cannot run on devices running iOS 11 and higher due to the system dropping support 32-bit apps.

Reception 

Gaming website IGN gave the game a 7.5 praising it for having the same old addictive game while adding a brand new one on top of that.

References 

 http://toucharcade.com/2009/04/01/namcos-galaga-remix-heading-to-the-app-store/
 IGN
 http://www.slidetoplay.com/galaga-remix-review/

IOS games
IOS-only games
Namco games
2009 video games
Galaxian
Video games developed in Japan